McCoole is an unincorporated community and census-designated place (CDP) in Allegany County, Maryland, United States. As of the 2010 census it had a population of 511.

McCoole is located at the intersection of U.S. Route 220 and the east end of Maryland Route 135. It lies directly across the North Branch Potomac River from Keyser, West Virginia. McCoole had its own post office in operation from 1903 to 1910.

Demographics

References

Census-designated places in Allegany County, Maryland
Census-designated places in Maryland
Populated places in the Cumberland, MD-WV MSA
Cumberland, MD-WV MSA
Populated places on the North Branch Potomac River